"Lolly Bomb" is a song by the Russian punk-pop-rave group Little Big. It was released on 8 December 2017 as the lead single from the group's third studio album 'Antipositive part one'.

History 
In an interview with Knife, the directors said the following about the song:

The release of the music video was 8 December 2017 on the group's official YouTube channel. The video was directed by Ilya Prusikin and Aline Pyazok.

The clip is set in North Korea, where Kim Jong-Un falls in love with a nuclear missile. Kim and the missile go on dates and make love. Just as Kim proposes, army men take the missile away from him and launches it into the sky. Kim is very upset about this, but as the video ends, he encounters another rocket and falls in love.

The group searched for an actor for the role of Kim Jong-Un for a long time. They looked at Russian actors, then Kazakh actors. In the end, they found an Australian actor of Hong Kong origin, Howard X, playing Kim

Awards and nominations

References 

Little Big (band) songs
2017 songs
Songs written by Ilya Prusikin